Ride quality refers to a vehicle's effectiveness in insulating the occupants from undulations in the road surface (e.g., bumps or corrugations). A vehicle with good ride quality provides a comfort for the driver and passengers.

Importance
Good ride quality provides comfort for the people inside the car, minimises damage to cargo and can reduce driver fatigue on long journeys in uncomfortable vehicles, and also because road disruption can impact the driver's ability to control the vehicle.

Suspension design is often a compromise between ride quality and car handling, because cars with firm suspension can result in greater control of body movements and quicker reactions. Similarly, a lower center of gravity is more ideal for handling, but low ground clearance limits suspension travel, requiring stiffer springs.

Ambulances have a special need for a high level of ride quality, in order to avoid further injury to the already ill passengers.

Technology
Early vehicles, like the Ford Model T, with its leaf spring, live axle suspension design, were both uncomfortable and handled poorly.

Historically, weight was key to allowing cars such as the Rolls-Royce Silver Cloud and the Cadillac in the 1950s and 1960s to have a more comfortable ride quality. However, there are various drawbacks to heavier cars, including poor fuel efficiency, acceleration, braking, cornering and additional stresses on components.

Over time, technology has shifted this curve outward, so that it is possible to offer vehicles that are extremely comfortable and still handle very well, or vehicles with excellent handling that are also reasonably comfortable. One technical solution for offering both excellent comfort and reduced or eliminating body roll is by using computer-controlled suspensions, such as hydraulic active suspension system (like Active Body Control) or active anti-roll bars, however such systems are expensive because of their complexity.

Factors affecting ride quality 
The main factors which affect ride quality are the stiffness of the suspension components (e.g. springs, shock absorbers, anti-roll bars and bushings). Other factors include suspension geometry, vehicle mass and weight distribution.

References

Further reading 
 
 Health issues raised by poorly maintained road networks, The EU Northern Periphery Roadex III project (co-funded by the European Union)
 International standard ISO 2631-1 (1997) Mechanical vibration and shock—Evaluation of human exposure to whole-body vibration—Part 1: General requirements.

Automotive suspension technologies